The Moncloa Chief of Staff, officially called Director of the Cabinet of the Prime Minister, is the most senior political appointee in the Office of the Prime Minister of Spain. The Chief of Staff is appointed by the Prime Minister as its senior aid. This position has no executive authority although it is the principal advisor to the Prime Minister and it coordinates the work action of the different departments of the Government as well as lead the Cabinet Office.

There is not a legal requirement for this role to exist but since Prime Minister Adolfo Suárez in 1976, each Prime Minister has appointed a person of their trust to this role. The current position is regulated in the Royal Decree 419/2018, of June 18, which restructures the Prime Minister's Office.

Role
The first time that this position was created was in 1976, when Carmen Díez de Rivera was appointed Chief of Staff, however, the role was not regulated until 1978, when a short Prime Minister's order integrate it in the Prime Minister's Office and gave it rank of Undersecretary. Its original duties were to assist when the Prime Minister require it.

With the passage of time this role were granted more responsibilities and in 1982, with Prime Minister Felipe González the structure of the Prime Minister's Office was extended creating a Cabinet which the Chief of Staff was leading. The powers of the Chief of Staff were also extended not only to advise the Prime Minister but to gather political information for the Prime Minister and the Deputy Prime Minister and to know what the different Government's department were doing to get a better coordination among them and the Prime Minister's Office. It was also entrusted with the mission of making reports and studies on any subject entrusted to him.

With the arrival of PM José María Aznar, all mentions to the Deputy Prime Minister were removed (because the Deputy PM was granted with its own Chief of Staff). Aznar also gave the Chief of Staff the rank of Secretary of State.

PM José Luis Rodríguez Zapatero continue expanding the powers of the Chief of Staff giving him competences over the protocol and security departments of the Prime Minister's Office as well as entrusting him with advice on economic matters.

With PM Rajoy the Chief of Staff reached the height of its power when he was granted with the supervision over the sanitary system of the prime minister's office and with powers over national security matters, when the Deputy Chief of Staff was also named Director of the Homeland Security Department.

PM Sánchez preserved all the powers that Rajoy granted to the Chief of Staff with a little changes because even when the Department of Homeland Security depended from the prime minister's chief of staff, the direction of the same was granted to an independent official (a military in this case) an not to the Deputy Chief of Staff.

Structure
The current officials of the Prime Minister's Cabinet are the following:
 The Moncloa Chief of Staff.
 The Moncloa Deputy Chief of Staff.
 The Secretary General of the Prime Minister's Office.
 The Secretary General for International Affairs, European Union, G20 and Global Security.
 The Director for Analysis and Studies.
 The Director of the Department of Homeland Security.

List of Chiefs of Staff

References

 
Politics of Spain
Spanish Prime Minister's Office
Secretaries of State of Spain